The Arthur Lovekin Prize for Excellence in Journalism is an annual journalism award in Western Australia. 
The Prize was established with the University of Western Australia in 1928 by journalist, newspaper owner and politician, Arthur Lovekin, who endowed £100 to provide an annual prize for students taking the diploma course for Journalism. The annual prize, initially of £5/5/-, was given to the most successful student, providing there was a student of sufficient merit. It has been awarded since 1929.

Since then the prize has been opened to all undergraduate and postgraduate students enrolled at UWA and to members of the Western Australian branch of the Australian Journalists' Association 'Media' section of the Media, Entertainment & Arts Alliance.
Currently, the winner receives $200 and a medal.
The Prize "…is awarded to the writer of the contribution which, in the opinion of the examiners, is the best contribution of the year by a Western Australian journalist published in an Australian newspaper or periodical produced, published or circulated in Western Australia."

Each candidate for the prize can submit only one contribution for consideration. The year is from 1 July to 30 June, but a candidate may submit for consideration a continuing story concerning a connected series of events, provided that the story commences prior to 30 June and is completed not later than 15 July.

The judges are the Discipline Chair of the Media and Communication discipline or nominee; a Professor of Media Communications, or nominee; and a representative of the Media Section of the Media, Entertainment & Arts Alliance.

Winners

1929: Paul Hasluck
1930: Paul Hasluck
1931: Kenneth McKenna
1932: Albert Edwin Dunstan
1933: Noel L. Ottaway
1934: Noel L. Ottaway
1935: Gabriel Parry
1936: Norman Bartlett
1937: No prize awarded
1938: No prize awarded
1939: G.C. Lefroy
1940: G.J. Odgers
1941: No prize awarded
1942: No prize awarded
1943: No prize awarded
1944: No prize awarded
1945: No prize awarded
1946: Douglas Royston Pratt
1947: R.G. Clarke
1948: J.E. Coulter
1949: C. Henderson
1950: J.N. Brown
1951: Hugh Schmitt
1952: N. Milne
1953: J.L.G. Marshall
1954: No prize awarded
1955: N.C. Braidwood
1956: No prize awarded
1957: John Payne
1958: No prize awarded
1959: No prize awarded
1960: No prize awarded
1961: No prize awarded
1962: Lloyd Marshall
1963: Hugh Edwards
1964: James Henderson
1965: John McIlwraith
1966: Philip Bodeker
1967: Catherine Martin & Peter Ellery
1968: P.J. Finn
1969: Catherine Martin
1970-1972: unknown
1973: Catherine Martin
1974: unknown
1975: Catherine Martin
1976: Bret Christian
1977-1978: unknown
1979: Catherine Martin
1980: Andre Malan 
1981-1984: unknown
1985: Paul Murray
1986: Cyril Ayris
1987: Unknown
1988: Martin Saxon
1989: Robyn Cash
1990: Cyril Ayris
1991: Mike van Niekerk
1992: Mark Thornton
1993: Brendan Nicholson
1994: Marnie McKimmie
1995: Margot Lang
1996: Vanessa Gould
1997: Michael Day
1998: Norman Aisbett
1999: Bevan Eakins
2000: Kim Macdonald
2001: John Flint
2002: Colleen Egan & Victoria Laurie
2003: John Flint
2004: Bret Christian
2005: Steve Pennells
2006: Steve Pennells
2007: Steve Pennells
2008: George Williams
2009: Gary Adshead
2010: Paige Taylor, Gary Adshead and Sean Cowan.
2011: Marnie McKimmie, Cathy O’Leary and Angela Pownall
2012: Paige Taylor
2013: Steve Pennells
2014: John Flint
2015: Paige Taylor & Natasha Robinson
2016: David Cohen
2017: No prize awarded
2018: Tony Barrass 
2019: Nathan Hondros
2020: Annabel Hennessy
2021: Aja Styles
2022: Peter de Kruijff

References 

Australian journalism awards
Awards established in 1928
1928 establishments in Australia